Calicina is a genus of armoured harvestmen in the family Phalangodidae. There are more than 20 described species in Calicina.

Species
These 25 species belong to the genus Calicina:

 Calicina arida Ubick & Briggs, 1989
 Calicina basalta Ubick & Briggs, 1989
 Calicina breva (Briggs, 1968)
 Calicina cloughensis (Briggs & Hom, 1967)
 Calicina conifera Ubick & Briggs, 1989
 Calicina digita (Briggs & Hom, 1967)
 Calicina diminua Ubick & Briggs, 1989
 Calicina dimorphica Ubick & Briggs, 1989
 Calicina ensata (Briggs, 1968)
 Calicina galena Ubick & Briggs, 1989
 Calicina kaweahensis (Briggs & Hom, 1966)
 Calicina keenea (Briggs, 1968)
 Calicina macula (Briggs, 1968)
 Calicina mariposa (Briggs, 1968)
 Calicina mesaensis Ubick & Briggs, 1989
 Calicina minor (Briggs & Hom, 1966)
 Calicina morroensis (Briggs, 1968)
 Calicina palapraeputia (Briggs, 1968)
 Calicina piedra (Briggs, 1968)
 Calicina polina (Briggs, 1968)
 Calicina sequoia (Briggs & Hom, 1966)
 Calicina serpentinea (Briggs & Hom, 1966)
 Calicina sierra (Briggs & Hom, 1967)
 Calicina topanga (Briggs, 1968)
 Calicina yosemitensis (Briggs, 1968)

References

Further reading

 
 
 
 
 

Harvestmen
Articles created by Qbugbot